Al-Talaba SC is an Iraqi professional association football club based in Al-Rusafa, Baghdad, who currently play in the Iraqi Premier League. It was established in 1977, and soon merged with another club called Al-Jamiea and have not been relegated from the league since. 

The club moved to Al Talaba Stadium in the early-1980s. Since 2010 the club has played their home games at several stadiums until the construction of the new stadium is finished. Al-Talaba is part of the Popular Teams of Baghdad, who whenever they play against each other, it is considered a derby. The other Popular Teams are Al-Shorta, Al-Zawraa and Al-Quwa Al-Jawiya. The club has won the Iraqi Premier League five times, the Iraq FA Cup twice and the Iraqi Elite Cup three times.

In the 1995 Asian Cup Winners' Cup Al-Talaba reached the final and lost to Bellmare Hiratsuka, becoming only the third Iraqi team (Aliyat Al-Shorta were the first in 1971 and Al-Rasheed were the second in 1989) to have reached this far into an AFC competition. They are also the first Iraqi team to become the runners-up of the Asian Cup Winners' Cup.

Key

Key to league:
 Pos = Final position
 P = Played
 W = Games won
 D = Games drawn
 L = Games lost
 GF = Goals scored
 GA = Goals against
 Pts = Points

Key to rounds:
 W = Winner
 RU = Runner-up
 SF = Semi-finals
 QF = Quarter-finals
 R16/R32 = Round of 16, round of 32, etc.
 1R/2R = First round, second round, etc.
 GS = Group stage

Seasons
Tables correct as of 3 July 2022

Al-Jamiea

Al-Talaba

Notes

References

Sport in Baghdad
Al Talaba seasons
Al-Talaba SC